Thirds is the third studio album by the American rock band James Gang. The album was released in mid 1971, on the label ABC Records. It is the last studio album featuring Joe Walsh. "Walk Away" was released as a single, making the Top 40 on at least one national chart, reaching #51 on the Billboard Hot 100, the best placement of a James Gang single. The album reached Gold status in July 1972.

On the liner notes to the LP version of this 1971 album, Joe Walsh is credited with "guitar, vocals, and train wreck", the latter for his work on the song "Walk Away" as a wry commentary on the multi-tracked, cascading lead guitars that clash as the song fades out.

The Walsh period of the band came to a close with the release of the next album James Gang Live in Concert.

Critical reception

Writing for AllMusic, critic William Ruhlman wrote the album "though Thirds quickly earned a respectable chart position and eventually went gold, it was not the commercial breakthrough that might have been expected."

Billboards review stated: "The James Gang has another good one here, another set scoring artistically and slated to score commercially. This hot trio has solid material, such as "Walk Away," country-flavored material such as "Dreamin' In The Country," and other top material, including "Midnight Man." "White Man/Black Man" is another winner." John Mendelsohn in Rolling Stone was equivocal stating "By no exertion of the imagination are James Gang the greatest rock and roll band ever to walk the face of the earth or anything...  but they are capable of some nice little treats every now and again." Mendelsohn conversely called "White Man/Black Man" "a real no-two-ways-about-it embarrassment in the form of an overproduced plea for Greater Understanding between the races so that we can all Live Together."

Track listing
Side one
 "Walk Away" – (Joe Walsh) – 3:32
 Joe Walsh – guitar, vocals, "train wreck"
 Dale Peters – bass
 Jim Fox – drums
 "Yadig?" – (Peters, Fox, Walsh) – 2:30
 Joe Walsh – guitar, electric piano
 Dale Peters – upright bass
 Jim Fox – drums, vibraphone
 "Things I Could Be" – (Fox) – 4:18
 Jim Fox – drums, vocals, organ
 Joe Walsh – guitar
 Dale Peters – bass
 "Dreamin' in the Country" – (Peters) – 2:57
 Dale Peters – bass, vocals
 Joe Walsh – guitar, pedal steel guitar
 Jim Fox – drums, tack piano
 "It's All the Same" – (Walsh) – 4:10
 Joe Walsh – guitar, vocals, piano
 Dale Peters – bass
 Jim Fox – drums

Side two
 "Midnight Man" – (Walsh) – 3:28
 Joe Walsh – guitar, lead vocals
 Dale Peters – bass, backing vocals
 Jim Fox – drums
 Bob Webb – backing vocals
 Mary Sterpka – backing vocals, lead vocals on the third chorus
 "Again" – (Walsh) – 4:04
 Joe Walsh – guitar, vocals, electric piano, violin arrangements
 Dale Peters – bass
 Jim Fox – drums
 "White Man / Black Man" – (Peters) – 5:39
 Dale Peters – bass, lead vocals
 Joe Walsh – guitar, piano
 Jim Fox – drums
 The Sweet Inspirations – backing vocals
 "Live My Life Again" – (Fox) – 5:26
 Jim Fox – drums, pianos
 Joe Walsh – guitar, vocals
 Dale Peters – bass

Personnel

James Gang
Joe Walsh – guitars, vocals, acoustic and electric pianos, pedal steel guitar, sound effects, "train wreck" (noted on the album cover; this reference is to the multiple cascading and heavily distorted guitars at the end of "Walk Away")
Dale Peters – bass guitar, vocals, upright bass
Jim Fox – drums, vocals, percussion, piano, organ, vibraphone

Guest musicians
Bob Webb – backing vocals on "Midnight Man"
Tom Baker – horns
Mary Sterpka – backing vocals on "Midnight Man"
The Sweet Inspirations – backing vocals on "White Man/Black Man"

Production
James Gang & Bill Szymczyk – producers
Bill Szymczyk – engineer
Kenneth Hamann – engineer
Eddie Youngblood – engineer
Dale Peters & Jim Fox – reissue liner notes
Tom Wilkes – cover design
Tom Wright – cover design, photography

Charts

References

External links
[ Billboard.com]

1971 albums
James Gang albums
ABC Records albums
Albums produced by Bill Szymczyk